Zachary Nutall (born December 16, 1999) is an American college basketball player for the SMU Mustangs of the American Athletic Conference (AAC). He previously played for the Sam Houston State Bearkats.

High school career
Nutall attended Bryan High School in Bryan, Texas, where he was named District 18-5A Offensive MVP as a senior.

College career
As a freshman at Sam Houston State, Nutall averaged 6.6 points and 3.2 rebounds per game in a reserve role. He averaged 15.4 points and 4.4 rebounds per game in his sophomore season, earning First Team All-Southland honors. On November 25, 2020, Nutall scored a career-high 36 points in a 97–67 loss to SMU. As a junior, he averaged 19.3 points and 5.7 rebounds per game and was named Southland Player of the Year. For his senior season, Nutall transferred to SMU.

Career statistics

College

|-
| style="text-align:left;"| 2018–19
| style="text-align:left;"| Sam Houston State
| 33 || 1 || 17.1 || .459 || .372 || .577 || 3.2 || .9 || .6 || .3 || 6.6
|-
| style="text-align:left;"| 2019–20
| style="text-align:left;"| Sam Houston State
| 30 || 30 || 30.1 || .454 || .328 || .729 || 4.4 || 2.0 || 1.5 || .2 || 15.4
|-
| style="text-align:left;"| 2020–21
| style="text-align:left;"| Sam Houston State
| 28 || 28 || 29.2 || .439 || .372 || .696 || 5.7 || 1.8 || 1.0 || .3 || 19.3
|-
| style="text-align:left;"| 2021–22
| style="text-align:left;"| SMU
| 33 || 29 || 24.0 || .352 || .325 || .528 || 3.7 || 1.5 || .5 || .1 || 6.8
|- class="sortbottom"
| style="text-align:center;" colspan="2"| Career
| 124 || 88 || 24.8 || .431 || .349 || .677 || 4.2 || 1.5 || .9 || .2 || 11.6

References

External links
SMU Mustangs bio
Sam Houston State Bearkats bio

1999 births
Living people
American men's basketball players
Basketball players from Texas
People from Bryan, Texas
Point guards
Sam Houston Bearkats men's basketball players
SMU Mustangs men's basketball players